Sunset Park may refer to:

Places in North America
Sunset Park, Las Vegas, Nevada, a park
Sunset Park, Brooklyn, New York, a neighborhood
Sunset Park (Brooklyn park), the namesake park
Sunset Park, Santa Monica, California, a neighborhood
Sunset Hill Viewpoint Park, Seattle, Washington, a neighborhood and namesake park
Sunset Park, Tampa, Florida, a neighborhood
Sunset Park Elementary School, Miami, Florida
Sunset Park Historic District, Wilmington, North Carolina
Sunset Park, Ontario

Other uses
Sunset Park (film), a 1996 film
Sunset Park (soundtrack), the soundtrack to the film above
Sunset Park (novel), a novel by Paul Auster, 2010
"Sunset Park", a song by Angels of Light from Everything Is Good Here/Please Come Home